Chod may refer to:

 Chief of Defence, the highest ranked commissioned officer of a nation's armed forces
 Chöd, a spiritual practice found in certain schools of Tibetan Buddhism
 CHOD-FM, a Canadian radio station
 Chöd drum or chöda, a damaru (drum) used in Hinduism and Tibetan Buddhism
 Chod region, an ethnographical region around Domažlice in West Bohemia, Czech Republic
 Chodové (sometimes called the Chod people), inhabitants of this region
 Chod dialect, spoken in this region
 Ch'od, a fictional character in the Marvel Universe

Language and nationality disambiguation pages